Leslie Perrins (7 October 1901 – 13 December 1962) was an English actor who often played villains. After training at RADA, he was on stage from 1922, and in his long career, appeared in well over 60 films.

Hobbies
Perrins and wife Violet were dog lovers, and he was a judge at Crufts in 1957, and president of the Welsh Corgi League from 1956 until his death. Their annual award, "The Leslie Perrins Memorial Trophy," is named after him.
He wrote a book called 'Keeping a Corgi'. It was published in 1958.

Filmography

 The Sleeping Cardinal (1931) as Ronald Adair (film debut)
 The House of Unrest (1931) as Cleaver
 The Rosary (1931) as Ronald Overton
 The Calendar (1931) as Henry Lascarne
 Betrayal (1932) as Clive Wilson
 White Face (1932) as Louis Landor
 The Lost Chord (1933) as Count Carol Zara
 Leave It to Smith (1933) as Duke of Bristol
 Early to Bed (1933) as Mayer
 The Pointing Finger (1933) as Honorable James Mallory
 The Roof (1933) as Inspector Darrow
 The Scotland Yard Mystery (1934) as John Freeman
 Lily of Killarney (1934) as Sir James Corrigan
 The Man Who Changed His Name (1934) as Frank Ryan
 The Lash (1934) as Alec Larkin
 Song at Eventide (1934) as Ricardo
 Lord Edgware Dies (1934) as Bryan Martin
 Gay Love (1934) as Gerald Sparkes
 Womanhood (1934) as Richard Brent
 Open All Night (1934) as Ranger
 D'Ye Ken John Peel? (1935) as Sir Charles Hawksley / Mr. Craven
 The Rocks of Valpre (1935) as Captain Rodolphe
 The Triumph of Sherlock Holmes (1935) as John Douglas
 The Village Squire (1935) as Richard Venables
 The White Lilac (1935) as Iredale
 The Silent Passenger (1935) as Maurice Windermere
 Lucky Days (1935) as Jack Hurst
 Line Engaged (1935) as Gordon Rutland
 Expert's Opinion (1935) as Richard Steele
 Sunshine Ahead (1936) as The Critic
 The Shadow of Mike Emerald (1936) as Mike Emerald
 They Didn't Know (1936) as Duval
 Tudor Rose (1936) as Thomas Seymour
 Rhythm in the Air (1936) as Mr. David, Dance Director
 Southern Roses (1936) as Don Ramon
 The Limping Man (1936) as Paul Hoyt
 No Escape (1936) as Anthony Wild
 Sensation (1936) as Strange
 The Price of Folly (1937) as Owen
 Bulldog Drummond at Bay (1937) as Maj. Grayson
 Secret Lives (1937) as J 14
 The High Command (1937) as Maj. Carson
 Mr. Reeder in Room 13 (1938) as Jeffrey Legge, alias Maj. Jeffrey Floyd
 Romance à la carte (1938) as Louis
 No Parking (1938) as Captain Sneyd
 His Lordship Goes to Press (1938) - Sir Richard Swingleton
 Calling All Crooks (1938) as Duvane
 Luck of the Navy (1938) as Briggs
 The Gables Mystery (1938) as Inspector Lloyd
 Old Iron (1938) as Richard Penshaw
 The Gang's All Here (1939) as Harper
 Wanted by Scotland Yard (1939) as Standish
 I Killed the Count (1939) as Count Mattoni
 Blind Folly (1939) as Deverell
 All at Sea (1940) as Williams
 The Prime Minister (1941) as Earl of Salisbury (uncredited)
 Suspected Person (1942) as Tony Garrett
 Women Aren't Angels (1943) as Schaffer
 Heaven Is Round the Corner (1944) as Robert Sedley
 I'll Turn to You (1946) as Mr. Chigwell
 The Turners of Prospect Road (1947) as Mr. Webster
 The Idol of Paris (1948) as Count Paiva
 It's Hard to Be Good (1948) as Major Gordon (uncredited)
 Man on the Run (1949) as Charlie
 A Run for Your Money (1949) as Burney
 Midnight Episode (1950) as Charles Mason
 The Lost Hours (1952) as Doctor Morrison
 Souls in Conflict (1954)
 Guilty? (1956) as Poynter
 Fortune Is a Woman (1957) as Chairman of Tribunal (uncredited)
 The Haunted Strangler (1958) as Newgate Prison Governor (final film)

References

External links

1901 births
1962 deaths
English male stage actors
English male film actors
English male television actors
People from Moseley
Alumni of RADA
20th-century English male actors